Ba Tơ is a rural district (huyện) of Quảng Ngãi province in the South Central Coast region of Vietnam. As of 2003 the district had a population of 47,268. The district covers an area of 1,133 km². The district capital lies at Ba Tơ.

In April 2012, there have been multiple reports of an outbreak of an unknown fatal disease in the area around Ba Tơ. See Quảng Ngãi skin disease outbreak for more details.

References

Districts of Quảng Ngãi province